Naqab or Neqab may refer to:
 Naqab, North Khorasan
 Neqab, a city in Razavi Khorasan
 Neqab, Khalilabad, Razavi Khorasan Province
 Neqab, Khvaf, Razavi Khorasan Province
 Neqab, Mashhad, Razavi Khorasan Province
 Neqab, Nishapur, Razavi Khorasan Province